Rômulo Henrique Peretta (born August 26, 1996) is a Brazilian footballer. Peretta previously had play for the youth sides of AA Flamengo.

Career

Youth 

Peretta ascended in the youth ranks of AA Flamengo, eventually reaching the U-20 team. There, Peretta was part of the U-20 team that made it to the Copa São Paulo de Futebol Júnior 2016 national tournament in January 2016. He also led Flamengo to a semifinal finish in the U20 Campeonato Paulista (State Cup), losing to eventual champions Corinthians.

Professional 

On 23 February 2016, Peretta joined the Richmond Kickers of the United States third-division United Soccer League. Peretta made his professional debut on 7 May 2016, starting and playing 45 minutes in 1–0 victory over the Wilmington Hammerheads.

References

External links 
Kickers Profile

Living people
1996 births
Brazilian footballers
Brazilian expatriate footballers
Brazilian expatriate sportspeople in the United States
Association football forwards
Richmond Kickers players
USL Championship players